The Children from the Hotel America (Lithuanian: Vaikai iš „Amerikos“ viešbučio) is a 1990 Lithuanian drama film.

The film revolves around the lives of teenagers in Soviet Lithuania. The protagonists of the film are fans of rock'n'roll music which is banned in the USSR and are interested in the hippie movement, secretly listening to the Luxembourg radio. They all live in a house which was formerly a hotel, called "America". Events of Kaunas' spring affect them as they are involved. After their attempt to send a letter to the Luxembourg radio, teenagers would become suspects by the KGB.

See also 
1972 unrest in Kaunas
Rock and roll and the fall of communism

External links 
imdb

1990 films
Lithuanian drama films